KVLE may refer to:

 KVLE-FM, a radio station (102.3 FM) licensed to Gunnison, Colorado, United States
 KVLE (AM), a defunct radio station (610 AM) formerly licensed to Vail, Colorado